The Castle of Medinaceli is a medieval fortress in Medinaceli (Province of Soria, Castile and León, Spain). It was built in the 9th century and rebuilt in the 15th century. Almanzor died here in 1002.

Gallery

See also
 List of castles in Spain

Buildings and structures in Medinaceli
Castles in Castile and León
Province of Soria
Military history of Al-Andalus
9th-century fortifications
15th-century fortifications